Ellesmere Port is a port town in the Cheshire West and Chester borough in Cheshire, England. The town had a population of 61,090 in the 2011 census. Ellesmere Port also forms part of the wider Birkenhead urban area, which had a population of 325,264 in 2011.

The town was originally established on the River Mersey at the entrance to the Ellesmere Canal.  As well as a service sector economy, it has retained large industries including Stanlow oil refinery, a chemical works and the Vauxhall Motors car factory. There are also a number of tourist attractions including the National Waterways Museum, the Blue Planet Aquarium and Cheshire Oaks Designer Outlet.

History

The town of Ellesmere Port was founded at the outlet of the never-completed Ellesmere Canal. The canal (now renamed) was designed and engineered by William Jessop and Thomas Telford as part of a project to connect the rivers Severn, Mersey and Dee. The canal was intended to be completed in sections. In 1795 the section between the River Mersey at Netherpool and the River Dee at Chester was opened. However the canal was not finished as first intended; it never reached the River Severn. Upon reevaluation it was decided that the costs to complete the project were not projected to be repaid because of a decrease in expected commercial traffic. There had been a loss of competitive advantage caused by steam engine-related economic advances (nationally, regionally and locally) during the first decade of canal construction. During or before the construction of the canal the village of Netherpool changed its name to the Port of Ellesmere, and by the early 19th century, to Ellesmere Port.

Settlements had existed in the area since the writing of the Domesday Book in the 11th century, which mentions Great Sutton, Little Sutton, Pool (now Overpool) and Hooton. The settlement of Whitby was a township in the ancient parishes of Eastham and Stoak, within the Wirral Hundred. The township, which included the hamlets of Ellesmere Port and Whitbyheath, became a civil parish in 1866. To enhance the economic growth of the area, the Netherpool, Overpool and Whitby civil parishes were abolished on 1 April 1911 to become parts of the new civil parish of Ellesmere Port. 

The first houses in Ellesmere Port itself, however, grew up around the docks and the first main street was Dock Street, which now houses the National Waterways Museum. Station Road, which connected the docks with the village of Whitby, also gradually developed and as more shops were needed, some of the houses became retail premises. The main employer at this time was Burnell's Iron Works which had been set up at the end of the nineteenth century. This was followed by the setting up of the Mersey Ironworks factory by the Wolverhampton Corrugated Iron Company In 1905 who settled on Ellesmere Port as a way of exploiting the company's international trade through the nearby ports of Birkenhead and Liverpool. Initially 300 workers and their families came from Wolverhampton and the surrounding areas to work in the factory, settling in a specially built worker's village named “Wolverham”. As the expanding industrial areas growing up around the canal and its docks attracted more workers to the area, the town itself continued to expand.

By the mid-20th century, thanks to the opening of the Manchester Ship Canal in 1894 and the Stanlow Oil Refinery in the 1920s, Ellesmere Port had expanded so that it now incorporated the villages of Great and Little Sutton, Hooton, Whitby, Overpool and Rivacre as suburbs. The town centre itself had moved from the Station Road/Dock Street area, to an area that had once been home to a stud farm (indeed, the former Ellesmere Port and Neston Borough Council officially referred to the town centre as Stud Farm for housing allocation purposes) around the crossroads of Sutton Way/Stanney Lane and Whitby Road.

The foundation stone for Ellesmere Port Civic Hall was laid by the Chairman of Ellesmere Port Borough Council, Horace Black, on 2 May 1953. It was designed in the modernist style and completed in 1955.

In the 20th century, a number of new housing estates were developed, many of them on the sites of former farms such as Hope Farm and Grange Farm. Many estates consisted of both council housing and privately owned houses and flats.

Ellesmere Port, in more recent times has had an influx of immigrants from Liverpool. Thus demand for housing increased with the opening of the Vauxhall Motors car plant in 1962. Opened as a components supplier to the Luton plant, passenger car production began in 1964 with the Vauxhall Viva. The plant is now Vauxhall's only car factory in Britain, since the end of passenger car production at the Luton plant in 2004 (where commercial vehicles are still made). Ellesmere Port currently produces the Vauxhall Astra model on two shifts, employing 2,500 people.

In the mid-1980s, the Port Arcades, a covered shopping mall was built in the town centre. By the 1990s, it was the retail sector rather than the industrial that was attracting workers and their families to the town. This was boosted with the building of the Cheshire Oaks outlet village and the Coliseum shopping park, which also included a multiplex cinema; prior to this since the closure of the cinema in Station Road, Little Sutton (King's cinema) and the Queen's cinema adjacent to Ellesmere Port railway station in the 1960s the town's only cinema had been a single screen in the EPIC Leisure Centre.

Since 1974 Ellesmere Port has been an unparished area when the civil parish of Ellesmere Port was abolished and all its functions were assumed by the new district of Ellesmere Port and Neston. The district was abolished in 2009, and the town no longer has its own council.

In August 2012, Marks & Spencer opened their largest store (apart from Marble Arch in London) on a site near the Coliseum shopping park.

Governance

Ellesmere Port was nearly included into the Metropolitan Borough of Wirral, in Merseyside, when that was formed on 1 April 1974. It was removed from the proposals before the Local Government Act 1972 had its first reading, and instead remained in Cheshire as part of the borough of Ellesmere Port and Neston.

Plans were announced which proposed combining the borough of Ellesmere Port and Neston with the Chester and Vale Royal districts to form a new "West Cheshire" unitary authority. The new unitary authority came into being on 1 April 2009 as Cheshire West and Chester. The Conservatives won control of this council in shadow elections in May 2008, winning a majority of seats in the Ellesmere Port area for the first time.

At national level, Ellesmere Port is part of the Ellesmere Port and Neston parliamentary constituency. , the current Member of Parliament (MP) is Justin Madders (Labour).

Demography

The 2011 census records 27,134 households in Ellesmere Port, with 40.9% of the population aged between 30 and 59. It lists the ethnicity of the town as 95.2% White British, 0.8% White Irish, 1.6% White Other, 0.8% mixed ethnicity, 1.1% Asian, 0.2% Black and 0.1% other. 97.8% speak English as a first language.

Religion
According to the 2011 census, the main religion of Ellesmere Port is Christianity with 72.1% of the population. 20% have no religion, 6% are unspecified, 0.4% are Muslim, 0.2% are Buddhist, 0.1% Hindu and 0.2% other.

Landmarks

Blue Planet Aquarium, largest aquarium in the UK 1998–1999
Cheshire Oaks Designer Outlet, largest outlet village in the UK 1995–present, largest outlet village in Europe 1995–1998.
The Coliseum Retail Park, retail outlet located next to Cheshire Oaks Outlet
Ellesmere Port Hospital, located in Whitby 
 Ellesmere Port Sports Village, a £15 million sports village opened in late 2015
Marks & Spencer, second largest store in the UK
National Waterways Museum, largest canal boat collection in the world
Stanlow Oil Refinery, second largest industrial space in the UK
Whitby Hall, listed Victorian building in Whitby Park and home of Action Transport Theatre company

Geography
Ellesmere Port is located at the southern end of the Wirral Peninsula, in the county of Cheshire. Its suburbs include Overpool to the north west, Westminster to the north, Rossmore to the north east, with Whitby and Wolverham to the south.

Parks and green spaces
 Whitby Park
 Rivacre Valley Local Nature Reserve
 Stanney Woods Nature Reserve

Transport

Road
Ellesmere Port is located near the interchange of the M56 and the M53 motorways. The A41 road between Birkenhead and Chester, also passes through the area. The M56 carries the  European Route E22 in this area.

Buses
There is a bus station in the town centre with frequent services to Chester, Liverpool, Runcorn, Elton, Helsby, Frodsham, Birkenhead and Neston. There are also services to Mold, North Wales operated by Stagecoach. Occasional National Express coaches serve the bus station. Most services are operated by Stagecoach Merseyside & South Lancashire with one service operated by Helms of Eastham and another by Arrowebrook Coaches.

Rail
Ellesmere Port railway station is on the Wirral line of the Merseyrail network and has a half-hourly electric train service to Liverpool via Birkenhead. The line was electrified from Hooton to Ellesmere Port by British Rail in 1994. There is also an infrequent service to Warrington.

Canal
The Manchester Ship Canal joins the Mersey estuary north-west of Ellesmere Port at Eastham, but the town is also the northern terminus of the Shropshire Union Canal (which used to exchange goods with seagoing boats at what is now the National Waterways Museum).

Sports

Speedway racing operated at the stadium in Thornton Road in the mid to late 1970s and in the 1980s; since March 2013, the stadium has been back in use for greyhound racing. Ellesmere Port Gunners raced in the lower tier Leagues. The Gunners' best season was their last, 1985, when they won the National League championship. The campaign was marred by a career-ending injury sustained by inspirational captain Joe Owen. Owen was hurt in a track crash at Birmingham. Ellesmere Port Town F.C. was once of town's main football team before the founding of Vauxhall Motors F.C. in 1963. Ellesmere Port Town F.C. was founded in 1948 and folded in 1973. The club's main achievements were playing in the Northern Premier League (The 7th tier in the English Football Pyramid) and reaching the F.A. Cup First Round in the 1971–1972 season, losing 3–0 to Boston United. Vauxhall Motors F.C. are the local football team.

In 2009 Eddie Izzard and his run around the UK for Sport Relief saw him pass through Little Sutton village centre and Hooton. The footage is only minutes long however.

In 2012 Ellesmere Port played host to the Paralympic Flame as part of the Paralympic Torch Relay celebrations. West Cheshire Colleges campus in Ellesmere Port was one of the drop off points for the flame as well as the EPIC leisure centre and the David Lloyd Leisure Centre. Events included sporting demonstrations and the parade of the Paralympic flame.

Construction began in January 2014 for the new multimillion-pound Sports Village in Stanney Grange which initially was to incorporate an Olympic sized swimming venue (now smaller), tennis courts, football pitches and other sport halls, and will be the new home of Cheshire Phoenix, the local professional British Basketball League team from the start of the 2015/16 BBL Championship season. The village is situated on site of the old Stanney High School by Cheshire Oaks, the Coliseum and M&S.

Notable people

The following people are natives of Ellesmere Port, or have lived there for a period of time.
 Norman Sailes (1920 in Ellesmere Port – 2012) a Fleet Air Arm pilot in WWII, awarded the Distinguished Service Cross
 Arthur Goddard (born 1921) was in charge of the Land Rovers engineering development from 1947 to 1957, went to the Little Sutton Primary School
 Charles Bronson (born 1952) also known as Charles Salvador, is an English criminal and "most violent prisoner in Britain" lived in Ellesmere Port in his early teens
 Hardeep Singh Kohli (born 1969) is a British presenter of Sikh heritage and TV presenter and personality. He lived briefly in the Little Sutton area.

Politics 
 Sir Herbert Williams, 1st Baronet (1884 in Hooton – 1954) Conservative MP for Reading 1924 to 1929, for Croydon South 1932 to 1945 and for Croydon East 1950 to 1954
 John Prescott (born 1938) ex-Deputy Prime Minister attended the Grange Secondary Modern School in 1948.
 Andrew Miller (1949–2019) former Labour MP for Ellesmere Port and Neston from 1992 to 2015. 
 Beverley Hughes (born 1950 in Ellesmere Port) Labour MP for Stretford and Urmston and former government minister

Creative Arts

 Edgar Foxall (1906 in Ellesmere Port – 1990) was an English poet whose work features in one of the Penguin poetry anthologies, Poetry of the Thirties (1964).
 Lillian Beckwith (1916–2004) author, born and grew up in Ellesmere Port the daughter of a grocer as chronicled in her book About My Father's Business
 Russ Abbot (born 1947) an English musician, comedian and actor, he grew up in the town's Wolverham district.
 Mike Singleton (1951–2012) an English teacher in Ellesmere Port, then a British video game designer 
 Ian Prowse (born 1964) singer, songwriter formerly of Pele and Amsterdam grew up in Little Sutton
 Stevie Riks (born 1967 in Ellesmere Port) an English comedian and impressionist, comedy writer, voice-over artist and multi-instrumentalist musician. 
 Stove King (born 1974 in Ellesmere Port) an English musician, formerly the bassist for the rock band Mansun
 Lee Latchford Evans (born 1975) an English singer, dancer, stage actor, kickboxer and personal trainer, member of pop group Steps grew up here.
 Pele (active 1990 to 1996) were an English indie rock band, formed in Ellesmere Port
 Hooton Tennis Club (formed 2013) a four-piece indie-rock band including James Madden and Callum McFadden who grew up in the area.

Sport

 Sam Chedgzoy (1889 in Ellesmere Port – 1967) footballer, played 279 times for Everton between 1910 and 1926.
 Joe Mercer OBE (1914 in Ellesmere Port – 1990) England football international and manager, led Manchester City to the 1968 First Division championship,  won the FA Cup (1969), League Cup (1970) and European Cup Winners' Cup (1970).
 Stan Cullis (1916 in Ellesmere Port – 2001) former Wolverhampton Wanderers player and manager, he played football for Cambridge Road School and Ellesmere Port Boys.
 Michael Ainsworth (1922 in Hooton – 1978) an English cricketer who played his county cricket for Worcestershire
 Dave Hickson (1929–2013) footballer who played for Everton, Liverpool and Tranmere Rovers, he also worked as an ambassador for Everton
 Ralph Gubbins (1932 in Ellesmere Port – 2011) an English professional footballer who made nearly 250 pro appearances 
 Tony Coleman (born 1945 in Ellesmere Port) an English former footballer who made 250 pro appearances
 Mick Wright (born 1946 in Ellesmere Port) an English former professional footballer who made 282 appearances for Aston Villa
 Geoff Davies (born 1947 in Ellesmere Port) is an English former professional footballer who made 305 pro appearances
 Graham Turner (born 1947 in Ellesmere Port) is former Shrewsbury Town, Wolverhampton Wanderers and Aston Villa manager
 Ian Bowyer (born 1951 in Little Sutton) footballer, with Manchester City and Nottingham Forest, 608 caps
 Paul Jones (born 1953 in Ellesmere Port) a former professional footballer who played 445 games for Bolton Wanderers
 Barry Siddall (born 1954 in Ellesmere Port) an English former professional goalkeeper, with 614 appearances
 Neil Whatmore (born 1955 in Ellesmere Port) an English former footballer who made 449 pro appearances
 Colin Woodthorpe (born 1969) footballer  grew up in the town, attended Stanney Comprehensive School, 928 appearances for Chester City, Norwich, Aberdeen and Bury.
 Rob Jones (born 1971) former footballer for Liverpool and England, 260 caps, grew up in the town.
 Anastasia Dobromyslova  (born 1984) former Women's World Professional Darts Champion lives in the town.
 Tony Martin (born 1981 in Ellesmere Port) Professional darts player and Team GB soft tips darts captain. 
 Johannah Leedham (born 1987 in Ellesmere Port) Team GB women's basketball captain for London 2012
 Paul Butler (born 1988 in Ellesmere Port) an English professional Bantamweight boxer and a former IBF Bantamweight champion
 Doug Ellis business entrepreneur and Aston Villa chairman.

See also
Listed buildings in Ellesmere Port
Ellesmere Port and Neston (UK Parliament constituency)

References

External links

Local Newspaper

 
Towns in Cheshire
Port cities and towns of the Irish Sea
Former civil parishes in Cheshire
Unparished areas in Cheshire
Populated places established in 1795